Kaşık Island, (literally "Spoon Island") is one of the nine islands comprising the Princes' Islands in the Sea of Marmara, near Istanbul. It is located between the islands of Burgazada and Heybeliada. Kaşık Adası is officially administered by Burgazada neighborhood in the Adalar district of Istanbul, Turkey.

See also
 List of islands of Turkey

References
 
 

Islands of the Sea of Marmara
Islands of Turkey
Neighbourhoods of Adalar, Istanbul
Islands of Istanbul Province